Chris Baines (born 4 May 1947) is an English naturalist, one of the UK's leading independent environmentalists. He is a horticulturalist, landscape architect, naturalist, television presenter and author.

Baines grew up in Sheffield, West Riding of Yorkshire. He worked in the local parks department when he left school, and then studied horticulture and landscape architecture at university.

Career
After an early career in landscape contracting, including several years of greening desert landscapes in the Middle East and community landscaping on UK inner-city housing estates, Baines taught landscape architecture at post-graduate level until 1986, when he was awarded an honorary personal professorship at Birmingham Polytechnic in Birmingham.

In 1980, he was one of a group of local environmentalists who co-founded the Urban Wildlife Group (now the Wildlife Trust for Birmingham and the Black Country), the first of a series of such urban conservation organisations to appear in the UK that year. This was the beginning of a burgeoning urban wildlife movement with which he has always had a close association, and he remains Vice-President of the Wildlife Trust for Birmingham and the Black Country.

Through most of the late 1980s and early 1990s, Baines focused on television broadcasting, and presented The Big E, Saturday Starship, Pebble Mill at One and several other networked series. The BBC TV programme Countryfile evolved from his original regional series "Your Country Needs You" and Baines was one of Countryfile 's first presenters.

Baines built the first wildlife garden ever allowed at Chelsea Flower Show in 1985, and in the same year his television programme Bluetits and Bumblebees, and his book, How to Make a Wildlife Garden, inspired many people to begin gardening with wildlife.

The Wild Side of Town, which accompanied a five-part television series of the same name, won the U.K. Conservation Book Prize in 1987. His other books include four-story books for young children. His investigative environmental series for children, The Ark, won the International Wildscreen Award in 1987. Also in 1987, Chris recorded an album, The Wild Side of Town, with the folk-rock Albion Band and then toured the U.K., raising money for the British Wildlife Appeal.

In 2000, he presented Charlie's Wildlife Gardens with Charlie Dimmock.

Baines is one of the U.K.'s leading environmental campaigners, and in recent years he has particularly championed the cause of trees. He led the fight to prevent cable television and other utility companies chopping through the roots of urban street trees. He has also promoted the concept of urban forestry in the U.K. He was a founding member of the steering committee of CABE Space, the U.K. Government's urban greenspace adviser.

He was principal adviser to Trees of Time and Place, a campaign for the millennium which encouraged people to gather seeds from a favourite tree, grow a seedling and plant it for the future. He also founded International Dawn Chorus Day in 1987. He was also a member of the steering board for the BBC's Breathing Places campaign.

Baines is committed to urban wildlife and wildlife gardening. He works from home in Wolverhampton, is a national vice-president of the Royal Society of Wildlife Trusts.  He is a former trustee of the Heritage Lottery Fund and also completed a further five years as a member of the HLF Expert Panel. He is president of the Association for Environment Conscious Building, the Thames Estuary Partnership and the Essex Wildlife Trust. In 2004 he was presented with the RSPB's annual Medal of Honour for his contribution to nature conservation and sustainable water management. In 2013 he was presented with the coveted Peter Scott Award by the British Naturalists Association. He is the patron of the Countryside Management Association and the Wildlife Gardening Forum, and president of the Wildside Activity Centre.  Baines is also a member of the National Trust's natural environment advisory group.

Baines works as a self-employed freelancer, and advises government ministers, local councils and senior executives in major water, minerals, finance, construction and housing companies, on environmental practice.

He is particularly active as a professional environmental adviser to the house-building and development industry in the UK. He chaired the independent design review panel for the largest new housing development in the Thames Gateway, East of London at Barking Riverside and he also advised on sustainability at the 2012 Olympic Athletes' Village and Westfield Shopping City in Stratford, East London. He advised on regeneration in the UN World Heritage city of Bath, Somerset, and in the new township of the Hamptons, Peterborough, and was retained by developers Lend Lease to advise on green infrastructure for the redevelopment of the Heygate Estate, Elephant and Castle.  In 2017 that development was shortlisted for the Stirling prize.  He has a particular interest in the environment of retirement housing and worked for several years as an adviser to specialist developer Beechcroft. He also advised the UK government's Department for Communities and Local Government (CLG) on biodiversity aspects of their proposed ecotowns. In 2010 he worked in the Gulf state of Qatar with the Boston Consulting Group, producing the twenty year forward strategy for that country's urban environments.

He has particular expertise in the field of sustainable water management. He has worked for a number of UK water companies, spent time as an adviser to the water regulator OFWAT and has worked with the Environment Agency to improve communication of whole river catchment management.
He also chairs the Stakeholder Advisory Group of the National Grid, appointed by the regulator Ofgem to provide independent guidance in a £500 million programme to reduce the visual impact of pylons in National Parks and Areas of Outstanding Natural Beauty.

Baines writes in BBC Gardeners' World, BBC Wildlife and Country Living magazines. and is a regular broadcaster on BBC Radio 4.  His film The Living Thames won the 2019 UK Charity Film Award and has won prizes and awards on four continents.  It has an introduction by Sir David Attenborough and is available worldwide through Amazon. He is also a Companion of the Guild of St George.

Television programmes
BBC Gardeners' World 1979, 1981 and 1999
Your Country Needs You 1988
Grass Roots 1993–96
Bluetits and Bumblebees 1985
The Big E 1988
Countryfile 1989–92
Saturday Starship 1986
Pebble Mill at One 1981–84
The Ark 1987
The Wild Side of Town 1987
Under the Axe 1998
Charlie's Wildlife Gardens 2000
The Living Thames 2019

Bibliography
(incomplete)
New Pollution Handbook 1992
A guide to habitat creation (with Jane Smart) 
Wildlife Garden Handbook
How to Make a Wildlife Garden (2000, 2nd revised edition). Frances Lincoln. 
The Wild Side of Town Publ. 1986 by Elm Tree Books/Hamish Hamilton and BBC publications  (Elm Tree Books) /  (BBC) (hardback),  (Elm Tree Books) /  (BBC) (paperback)
Royal Horticultural Society Companion to Wildlife Gardening, 2015

Children's books
The Old Boot
The Picnic
The Flower
The Nest

Awards
International Wildscreen Awards, winner of children's TV prize for The Ark, 1987
Sir Peter Kent Conservation book prize for The Wild Side of Town, 1987
Honorary Fellow, the Institute of Leisure and Amenity Management
Honorary Fellow, the Chartered Institute of Water and Environmental Management
Honorary personal chair, University of Central England
Honorary Doctorate, Sheffield Hallam University
Peter Scott Award, British Naturalists Association
RSPB Medal for contribution to conservation
Winner, UK Charitable Film Awards as presenter of The Living Thames

References

External links

The Albion Band – The Wild Side of Town

English naturalists
English environmentalists
English gardeners
English television presenters
English garden writers
English non-fiction writers
People from Sheffield
People from Wolverhampton
People educated at Ecclesfield Grammar School
1947 births
Living people
Guild of St George
English male non-fiction writers
Alumni of Wye College